The 2006–07 Ligue 1 season was the 69th since its establishment, and started in August 2006 and ended in May 2007. Lyon became French champions, having won their sixth consecutive title.

Participating teams

Lyon were the reigning champions of France for the sixth time running. Following a defeat for their nearest challengers, Lyon won the league with six games to play, on 21 April, becoming the first team in the so-called "Big Five" European leagues to win six consecutive championships.

 Auxerre
 Bordeaux
 Le Mans
 Lens
 Lille
 Lorient
 Lyon
 Marseille
 Monaco
 Nancy
 Nantes
 Nice
 Paris Saint-Germain
 Rennes
 Saint-Étienne
 Sedan
 Sochaux
 Toulouse
 Troyes
 Valenciennes

League table

Results

Top goalscorers

Player of the Month

All-League first team

Richert (Sochaux)
Sagna (Auxerre) – Cris (Lyon) – Hilton (Lens) – Abidal (Lyon)
Se.Keita (Lens) – Nasri (Marseille) – F.Malouda (Lyon)
A.Keita (Lille) – Elmander (Toulouse) – Savidan (Valenciennes)

Award of the Year 

Player of the Year : Florent Malouda (Lyon)

Goalkeeper of the Year : Teddy Richert (Sochaux)

Youth of the Year: Samir Nasri (Marseille)

Manager of the year : Gérard Houllier (Lyon)

Goal of the Year : Ilan (Saint-Étienne) for his goal against PSG

References

External links
France 2006/07 at Rec.Sport.Soccer Statistics Foundation

Ligue 1 seasons
France
1